"Never Had a Dream Come True" is a song written by Stevie Wonder and Motown staff songwriters Henry Cosby and Sylvia Moy, released as a single on the Tamla subsidiary by Wonder in February 1970. Featured on his 12th studio release, Signed, Sealed & Delivered, as the lead single, "Never Had..." was a modest hit in the U.S. upon its release, debuting at No. 67 on the Billboard Hot 100 during the week of Feb. 7, 1970, and No. 11 on the R&B chart.  
The song received a boost in the U.K., where it eventually broke into the top 10 and peaked at No. 6.

Background
Cash Box described it as a "gentle ballad bombshell" and an "outstanding offering with across-the-board power."

Credits
Lead and background vocals and clavinet by Stevie Wonder
Instrumentation by The Funk Brothers and the Detroit Symphony Orchestra
Arranged by Paul Riser

Chart performance

References

The Sound of Stevie Wonder: His Words and Music

1969 songs
1970 singles
Stevie Wonder songs
Songs written by Stevie Wonder
Songs written by Henry Cosby
Songs written by Sylvia Moy
Song recordings produced by Henry Cosby